Wind Me Up may refer to:
"Wind Me Up (Let Me Go)", a 1965 song by Cliff Richard
"Wind Me Up", a song by Mr Big from their self-titled album